The Ontario Social Benefits Tribunal (SBT) is an adjudicative tribunal in the province of Ontario, Canada. The SBT is empowered to hear appeals of administrative decisions related to social assistance. It is one of the 13 adjudicative tribunals overseen by the Ministry of the Attorney General that make up Tribunals Ontario.

Authority
The SBT was created under the Ontario Works Act. The members of the tribunal are appointed by the Lieutenant Governor in Council. Members of the SBT are empowered to hear cases in person or in writing. All hearings of the SBT are private.

The SBT may hear appeals under the Ontario Works Act as well as the Ontario Disability Support Program Act. The jurisdiction of the SBT is limited; the SBT cannot make an order on appeal that the original administrator did not have the authority to make, nor can the SBT make a decision on the constitutional validity of legislation or on the legislative authority for a regulation made under any legislation.

References

External links
Social Benefits Tribunal
Ontario Laws

Ontario government tribunals